The 1991 New Orleans Saints season was the team's 25th season in the National Football League. The Saints won their first-ever division title, and reached the postseason for the second consecutive year. However, they lost their playoff opener at home in the wild card round to their bitter division rival, the Atlanta Falcons, and would have to wait another nine years before winning their first playoff game in franchise history.

The 1991 Saints had 48 defensive takeaways, tied for the most for any team in a single season in the 1990s. Statistics site Football Outsiders calculates that the 1991 Saints had the second-best defense in the NFL (behind the Philadelphia Eagles), and one of the top-ten defenses of all time, in terms of efficiency. This was also the first season where four linebackers from the same team made the pro bowl, which the Saints would do again the next season. Says Football Outsiders, The Saints were led by their linebackers, with Sam Mills, Vaughan Johnson, and Pat Swilling all making the Pro Bowl and Rickey Jackson being awesome without getting a trip to Hawaii. It wasn't really the easiest year to find space on the NFC Pro Bowl defense, was it?

The season saw the adoption of the Cha-Ching slogan from a Rally's advertising campaign.

Offseason

NFL Draft

Personnel

Staff

Roster

Regular season

Schedule

Playoffs

Standings

Regular season

Week 3

Rams Jim Everett completed only 6 passes against the Saints defense, while Craig Heyward scored 2 touchdowns to send the Saints to a 3-0 record.

Playoffs

NFC Wild Card Game

Falcons quarterback Chris Miller completed the game-winning 61-yard touchdown pass to wide receiver Michael Haynes with 2:41 left in the contest. Miller completed 18 out of 30 passes for 291 yards and 3 touchdowns.

Awards and records
Pat Swilling, NFL Defensive Player of the Year
Led NFL, Fewest Points Allowed, 211 points

Milestones

References

External links
Saints on Pro Football Reference
Saints on jt-sw.com

New Orleans
New Orleans Saints seasons
NFC West championship seasons
New